Underwear is the debut album by Swedish pianist Bobo Stenson recorded in 1971 and released by the ECM label.

Reception
The Allmusic review by Jim Todd stated: "This LP from ECM's early days finds Swedish pianist Bobo Stenson leading bassist Arild Andersen and drummer Jon Christensen in a program of uncompromising, collectively improvised post-bop... Although structured as a piano trio, this set's main attraction is the opportunity to hear, up close, the enormous talents of Christensen and Andersen. That, in turn, though, says something about the egalitarian spirit of Stenson".

Track listing
All compositions by Bobo Stenson, except as indicated
 "Underwear" – 7:45
 "Luberon" – 9:20
 "Test" – 3:30 
 "Tant W" – 8:50
 "Untitled" (Ornette Coleman) – 3:55
 "Rudolf" (Arild Andersen) – 6:10
Recorded at the Bendiksen Studio in Oslo, Norway on May 18 & 19, 1971

Personnel
Bobo Stenson – piano
Arild Andersen – bass
Jon Christensen – percussion
Technical
Jan Erik Kongshaug - engineer
Leena Westerlund - design

References

ECM Records albums
Bobo Stenson albums
1971 debut albums
Albums produced by Manfred Eicher